Zaryszyn (in old period, probably 600 years ago, was named Zalesie) is a village in the administrative district of Gmina Książ Wielki, within Miechów County, Lesser Poland Voivodeship, in southern Poland.

The village has an approximate population of 350.

References

Zaryszyn